Inthi Ninna Preethiya is a 2008 Indian Kannada-language drama film written, directed and produced by Duniya Soori. The film's plot revolves around a family which struggles due to the bad effects of alcohol addiction.

The film features Srinagar Kitty (credited as Krishna), Bhavana and newcomer Sonu Gowda in pivotal roles. The film score and soundtrack were composed by Sadhu Kokila. The cinematography was done by Suri's previous associate Satya Hegde and was edited by Deepu S. Kumar.

The film was released on 29 February 2008 to mixed reviews from the critics. However the movie became one of the cult classic and reminded Late. Puttanna Kanagal, K. Balachander style of movies portraying family issues. While the cinematography, music direction and art director received praises, the film's screenplay and direction was criticized for glorifying the alcoholism. The film was declared a musical hit with its soundtrack hitting high on popularity. For the year 2008–09, the film bagged the Karnataka State Film Awards for the Best Music (Sadhu Kokila) and Best Female Playback Singer (Vani Harikrishna).

Plot
Rajeev (Srinagar Kitty), hailing from a well-to-do family is a painter by passion. He falls in love with his friend's sister Namana (Sonu) much to the disapproval of his friend. The lovers part ways after some high level drama. Rajeev, dejected in life, hits the bar and begins to drink alcohol. He gradually goes to the highest level of addiction and spends his entire days drinking and getting abused by other people.

Unable to bare his plight, his brother forcefully gets him married off to Parimala (Bhavana). Despite this, he does not mend his ways and steals money at his own house to consume his drink. Eventually, he loses his wife to an accident and is left with his only daughter who shows a very promising talent in music. A series of tragic events occur and a musical professor (SPB) makes him realize his mistake of ignoring his daughter and her musical talent. The film ends with Rajeev happily spending time with his daughter and promoting her musical skills.

Cast
 Srinagar Kitty as Rajeev
 Bhavana as Parimala
 Sonu Gowda as Namana
 Rangayana Raghu as "Naayi" Seenappa
 Kishore as Prakash
 Pawan Kumar as Vasane Babu
 Balu Nagendra
 Jayashree as Kalyani
 M. N. Lakshmi Devi as Jayamma
 Dinesh Mangalore
 Arun Sagar as Cheluvayya
 Vikas (credited as Ravikiran) as Shankar
 Preethi Chandrashekar as Padma
 Chandrashekar as Muruga
 Prathiksha as Prarthana
 Priyanka as Chukki
 S. P. Balasubrahmanyam in a cameo appearance

Production

Development
Soori, a protege of Yogaraj Bhat, fresh from the success of his debut film, Duniya, worked on a story line for six months. He announced his second venture to be presented by Bhat and produced by himself along with his friend Subramanya. The film's launch was held at the Kanteerava Studios in Bangalore on 19 August 2007. Soori revealed that the audience would relate themselves in the film and would reflect one's own life.

Casting
Actor Srinagar Kitty alias Krishna, who was seen in supporting roles in Chandra Chakori and Giri was roped in to play the lead character. He hoped that his character would give him strong boost in his emerging career. After a long gap, actress Bhavana was roped in to play the wife character. She was residing in Mumbai and was busy with her Bollywood assignments during the signing of this film. Sonu Gowda, daughter of actor and makeup artist Ramakrishna, was signed on to play the lover role in her debut. Pawan Kumar who later turned director, was also cast to play the antagonist role.

Filming
The filming took place majorly at Bangalore and few scenes were shot in Kasargod district of Kerala state.

Soundtrack

Sadhu Kokila scored the film's background music and composed its soundtrack, lyrics for which was penned by Jayanth Kaikini, Yogaraj Bhat and Ranganath. The soundtrack album consists of eight tracks. It was released in Bangalore. Ashwini Music of Ashwini Media distributed the audio into the market.

Reception
The reviewer for Indiaglitz.com called the soundtrack album of the film as a "lyrical extravaganza". Calling "Madhuvana Karedare" as the pick of the album, the reviewer observed the soundtrack to be a surprise package by Sadhu Kokila.

Reception

Critical response 

R G Vijayasarathy of Rediff.com scored the film at 2.5 out of 5 stars and wrote "Chatterbox Rangayana Raghu is different in this film.  He and Kishor are brilliant in their respective roles. In the play of words between the hero and the heroine, writer Suri shines but on the whole, there is fewer sparks in the dialogues penned by him. Inthi Ninna Preethiya would have been a better film if not for the repetitive sequences". A critic from Sify.com wrote  "Satya Hegde is sure to be in the competition for an award for his camera work. The dark and medium lighting he has used the capturing of some of the locations are like paintings on the screen".

References

External links
 

2008 films
2000s Kannada-language films
Films directed by Duniya Soori